Platypodinae is a weevil subfamily in the family Curculionidae. They are important early decomposers of dead woody plant material in wet tropics; all but two species are ambrosia beetles that cultivate fungi in tunnels excavated in dead wood as the sole food for their larvae. They are sometimes known as pinhole borers.

Genera 
Tribus: Mecopelmini
 Mecopelmus

Tribus: Platypodini
 Austroplatypus – Baiocis – Carchesiopygus – Costaroplatus – Crossotarsus – Cylindropalpus – Dendroplatypus – Dinoplatypus – Doliopygus – Epiplatypus – Euplatypus – Megaplatypus – Mesoplatypus – Myoplatypus – Neotrachyostus – Oxoplatypus – Pereioplatypus – Peroplatypus – Platyphysus – Platypus – Teloplatypus – Trachyostus – Treptoplatypus – Triozastus

Tribus: Schedlariini
 Schedlarius

Tribus: Tesserocerini
 Diapodina - Tesserocerina

See also 
 Ambrosia beetle

References

External links 

 
Taxa named by William Edward Shuckard